Rocky Head, also known as Rockyhead, is an unincorporated community in Dale County, Alabama, United States.

History
Rocky Head was founded three miles south of where the community is today. The name of the community described the site of the original post office, which sat near the head of Claybank Creek. The community kept its original name after moving to its current site. A post office operated under the name Rocky Head from 1855 to 1904.

A portion of the 15th Regiment Alabama Infantry came from Rocky Head.

References

Unincorporated communities in Dale County, Alabama
Unincorporated communities in Alabama